Indigofera arrecta, variously called the Bengal, Java, or Natal indigo, is a species of flowering plant in the family Fabaceae. It is native to SubSaharan Africa, the Arabian Peninsula, and Madagascar, and has been introduced to the Indian Subcontinent, Southeast Asia, some of the islands of Indonesia, the Philippines, and Queensland in Australia. Today it is occasionally used as a green manure, but historically was a major source of Indigo dye, with  under cultivation in India in 1896, declining to a few thousand hectares 60 years later.

References

arrecta
Flora of West Tropical Africa
Flora of West-Central Tropical Africa
Flora of Northeast Tropical Africa
Flora of East Tropical Africa
Flora of South Tropical Africa
Flora of KwaZulu-Natal
Flora of the Northern Provinces
Flora of Swaziland
Flora of Madagascar
Flora of Saudi Arabia
Flora of Yemen
Plants described in 1847